Kimberly Plache (born January 4, 1961) is an American Democratic politician and former member of the Wisconsin State Senate.

Early life and education
Born in Racine, Wisconsin, Plache graduated from William Horlick High School in 1979. In 1984, she received her bachelor's degree in psychology from University of Wisconsin–Parkside.

Career
Shortly after her college graduation, Plache was hired as a legislative aide by her representative in the Wisconsin State Assembly, Jeffrey A. Neubauer.  When Neubauer chose not to run for re-election in 1988, Plache ran and was elected to succeed him in the Assembly.

She was re-elected in 1990, 1992, and 1994.

In October 1995, Racine County's representative in the Wisconsin Senate, George Petak, ran into controversy when he changed his vote on a funding bill for the Miller Park stadium. Miller Park was being planned to replace the forty-year-old Milwaukee County Stadium and was being pushed by Republican Governor Tommy Thompson and Milwaukee Brewers owner and future-Commissioner of Baseball, Bud Selig.  Petak had promised his constituents that he would vote against the bill, but changed his mind based on the belief that the Brewers would leave Wisconsin if a new stadium wasn't built.

Petak's deciding vote supported a 0.1 percent sales tax increase for the five counties in the proposed stadium's vicinity, including Racine. Petak faced immediate outrage in his home district, and local Democrats were energized to collect signatures for a recall petition. The petition was certified on March 26, 1996, and a recall election was ordered for June.

Plache decided to run in the recall and faced no competition in the Democratic primary.  In June, she defeated Petak, making him the first Wisconsin state legislator to be removed from office in a recall election.

Plache was re-elected to a full term in the senate in 1998, defeating Racine Unified School Board Member David Hazen.  Plache sought re-election again in 2002, but was narrowly defeated by Republican Cathy Stepp.

In 2009, the Mayor of Racine was forced to resign after being indicted.  Plache ran in the special election to replace him, but did not pass the primary.  In the same year, however, she was elected to the Racine Unified School Board.  She served on the school board until 2016.

She is currently a senior community relations officer for the Wisconsin Housing and Economic Development Authority.

Personal life
Plache married Paul Hable in October 1999.  They live in Mount Pleasant, Wisconsin, and they have one daughter.

Electoral history

Wisconsin Assembly (1988-1994)

| colspan="6" style="text-align:center;background-color: #e9e9e9;"| Primary Election

| colspan="6" style="text-align:center;background-color: #e9e9e9;"| General Election

| colspan="6" style="text-align:center;background-color: #e9e9e9;"| Primary Election

| colspan="6" style="text-align:center;background-color: #e9e9e9;"| General Election

| colspan="6" style="text-align:center;background-color: #e9e9e9;"| Primary Election

| colspan="6" style="text-align:center;background-color: #e9e9e9;"| General Election

| colspan="6" style="text-align:center;background-color: #e9e9e9;"| Primary Election

| colspan="6" style="text-align:center;background-color: #e9e9e9;"| General Election

Wisconsin Senate (1996-2002)

| colspan="6" style="text-align:center;background-color: #e9e9e9;"| Primary Election

| colspan="6" style="text-align:center;background-color: #e9e9e9;"| General Election

| colspan="6" style="text-align:center;background-color: #e9e9e9;"| Primary Election

| colspan="6" style="text-align:center;background-color: #e9e9e9;"| General Election

| colspan="6" style="text-align:center;background-color: #e9e9e9;"| Primary Election

| colspan="6" style="text-align:center;background-color: #e9e9e9;"| General Election

Racine Mayor (2009)

| colspan="6" style="text-align:center;background-color: #e9e9e9;"| Primary Election

| colspan="6" style="text-align:center;background-color: #e9e9e9;"| General Election

Racine School Board (2009–2016)

| colspan="6" style="text-align:center;background-color: #e9e9e9;"| General Election

| colspan="6" style="text-align:center;background-color: #e9e9e9;"| General Election

| colspan="6" style="text-align:center;background-color: #e9e9e9;"| General Election

| colspan="6" style="text-align:center;background-color: #e9e9e9;"| General Election

Notes

Politicians from Racine, Wisconsin
University of Wisconsin–Parkside alumni
School board members in Wisconsin
Members of the Wisconsin State Assembly
Wisconsin state senators
Women state legislators in Wisconsin
1961 births
Living people
William Horlick High School alumni
21st-century American women